Dvorce may refer to places:

Dvorce (Bruntál District), a municipality and village in the Moravian-Silesian Region, Czech Republic
Dvorce (Jihlava District), a municipality and village in the Vysočina Region, Czech Republic
Dvorce, Saraj, a village in North Macedonia
Dvorce (Slovakia), a former village in Slovakia
Dvorce, Brežice, a settlement in Slovenia

See also
Divorce (disambiguation)